Myandra is a genus of South Pacific ground spiders that was first described by Eugène Louis Simon in 1887.

Species
 it contains four species, found only in Australia:
Myandra bicincta Simon, 1908 – Australia
Myandra cambridgei Simon, 1887 (type) – Australia
Myandra myall Platnick & Baehr, 2006 – Australia (Queensland to Tasmania)
Myandra tinline Platnick & Baehr, 2006 – Southern Australia

See also
 List of Gnaphosidae species

References

Araneomorphae genera
Gnaphosidae
Spiders of Australia